Barsegh Kirakosyan (born on 23 September 1982) is a former Russian-born Armenian former football defender. He also holds Russian citizenship.

International
He was a member of the Armenia national team, and has participated in four international matches since his debut in a friendly an away game against Hungary on 18 February 2004.

National team statistics

External links

Profile at championat.ru 

1982 births
Sportspeople from Vladikavkaz
Russian people of Armenian descent
Living people
Armenian footballers
Armenia international footballers
Association football midfielders
FC Lada-Tolyatti players
FC KAMAZ Naberezhnye Chelny players
FC Khimki players
FC Yenisey Krasnoyarsk players
Russian Premier League players
FC Spartak Vladikavkaz players
FC Mashuk-KMV Pyatigorsk players